Polkovnik Lambrinovo Airport  was an Air Base located 5 nm southwest of Silistra, Silistra, Bulgaria. It closed down in December 1999.

See also
List of airports in Bulgaria

References

External links 
 Airport record for Polkovnik Lambrinovo Airport at Landings.com

Airports in Bulgaria
Silistra Province